"Wrap Your Troubles in Dreams" (also known as "Wrap Your Troubles in Dreams (and Dream Your Troubles Away)") is a popular song written by Harry Barris with lyrics by Ted Koehler and Billy Moll, published in 1931.
 
The original 1931 popular hit recording was made by Bing Crosby with the Gus Arnheim Orchestra on March 2, 1931 for Victor Records,  but the song has become a standard, recorded by many other artists since.  Bing Crosby recorded the song four times over his career as well as performing its film debut in the Mack Sennett short, One More Chance (1931). An outtake from one of the sessions recorded on June 9, 1939 was preserved by blooper compiler Kermit Schafer in which Bing has his most famous “blowup” when he continues singing ad-lib and occasionally risqué words perfectly in tune.

That outtake was presented in the PBS American Masters episode Bing Crosby Rediscovered.

Imogene Coca performed this song in an episode of Your Show of Shows while dressed as a hobo; the audience reaction was so favorable that she encored her version in the last episode of the variety series, making this the only song she performed in two different episodes of Your Show of Shows.

Other notable recordings
1931 Louis Armstrong - recorded November 4, 1931 for Okeh Records, catalog No. 41530.
1931 Mildred Bailey - recorded September 15, 1931 for Brunswick Records (6184).
1942 Erskine Hawkins and His Orchestra (vocal by Jimmy Mitchelle) -  reached the No. 23 position in the Billboard charts in 1942.
1946 Georgia Gibbs
1947 Frankie Laine. He also sang it in the film Rainbow 'Round My Shoulder (1952).
1954 Frank Sinatra for his album Swing Easy
1958 Dean Martin for his Sleep Warm album.
1960 Sue Raney in her Songs for a Raney Day album.
1961 Sarah Vaughan - for her album The Divine One.
1964 Tony Bennett included in his album Who Can I Turn To.
1974 Barbra Streisand included in the soundtrack The Way We Were: Original Soundtrack Recording.
1982 Alberta Hunter in The Glory of Alberta Hunter

References

External links
 jazzstandards.com

Songs about depression
Songs about dreams
Songs with music by Harry Barris
Songs with lyrics by Ted Koehler
Mildred Bailey songs
1931 songs
Okeh Records singles